Nuri is a work of science fiction written in Bengali by the Bengali novelist Premendra Mitra. This story was first published by Deb Sahitya Kutir, Kolkata, West Bengal, India, in the Puja Annual titled Rangarakhi in 1947. It was the second story in GhanaDa series, the first one being মশা (the mosquito) published in 1945. Ghanashyam Das, alias Ghanada, the protagonist of the Ghanada series of science-fiction novels  written in Bengali is a fictional character created by Premendra Mitra.

Characterization
The character of Ghanashyam Das alias Ghanada was outlined as a bachelor, dark complexioned male with tall, boney and skeletal structure, having age “anywhere between thirty five to fifty five”, as described by the author himself in Mosha, the first story of the Ghanada series. He stayed in the third floor attic of a shared apartment (মেস বাড়ি) at no. 72, Banamali Naskar Lane, Calcutta, West Bengal, India, along with other boarders, who called him Ghana-da, while the term “da” is a suffix added to the name of an elder male in Bengal to convey reverence and affection. Though he was rarely found engaged in any activity or work other than telling fantastic tales to the boarders of the apartment, his stories engaged him with most of the major events happened in the world for last two hundred years and there was no place on earth which he didn't visit. 

Premendra Mitra, the creator, described Ghana~da in an interview by A K Ganguly published in SPAN in 1974, as under:

Plot

It was a rainy day in 1947. The city of Calcutta had almost become Venice. Most of the streets were waterlogged, with almost no public transport available. All boarders of the shared apartment at 72 Banamali Naskar Lane were detained for day long and desperately trying to pass time, expecting GhanaDa to initiate his tall tales. Unfortunately, GhanaDa was not in a mood to talk that day and his only activity was to yawn like a roaring lion. It was a complete failure in instigating GhanaDa to open his mouth, and after trying hard for a long time discussing various topics, Ram directly charged him saying, ”GhanaDa, didn’t you do weight lifting ever?” 

There the story began.

The story was based on Efata, the capital of New Hebrides, presently known as the Vanuatu. GhanaDa was there apparently in connection with his business of Sandalwood, and was stationed in the small Island of Aneghowhat  in the south of Port Villa. He met Monsieur Petra, a French man explorer. Six years later he again met Petra in a uninhabited island about ten miles away from Aneghowhat. On the top of a mysterious hill about two thousand feet high there was a mysterious lake high above the sea level. M. Petra was stationed in a cave and along with him GhanaDa dived into the depth of the lake only to find an abundance of diamond embedded in the belts of bluish Kimberlite under the water of the lake. GhanaDa couldn't resist himself from lifting one large piece of Diamond, and BOOM! the island blew up. 

When Shibu asked, “Where is that diamond now, GhanaDa?”, GhanaDa was unmindful. Apparently he couldn't hear and didn't reply.

Characters
Ghanashyam Das alias Ghanada
Ram (appeared in this story only)
Shibu
Gouranga alias Gour
Author (anonymous in this story. However, now we know it is Sudhir)
Malana, the house owner in Port Vila
Monsieur Petra, an explorer

Scientific references
The Vanuatu archipelago in the South Pacific is the host of some of the most spectacular volcanoes, such as Ambae, Ambrym, Lopevi, and Yasur. There are a few active or erupting volcanos as well as many dormant and extinct volcanoes too. The author, Premendra Mitra, extensively studied the geology, anthropology and ornithology of the area and explained vividly in simple words and explicit details the possibilities of getting diamonds in kimberlite pipes formed in volcanic activities. The story appears to have every possibility to be a real experience, had the readers not knowing the characterization of GhanaDa.

References

External links

1947 short stories
Indian short stories
Science fiction short stories
Short stories set in India
Vanuatu in fiction
Ghanada short stories